San Pedro College is a private, Catholic, research, coeducational basic and higher education institution run by the Dominican Sisters of the Trinity in Davao City, Davao del Sur, Philippines. It was founded in 1956.

It began as a school of nursing of the San Pedro Hospital, the first Catholic hospital in Mindanao, which the religious sisters have been operating since their arrival in 1948. Now, it encompasses several allied health sciences, arts and sciences, education and business programs, in addition to the nursing course it first offered.

The college is broadly organized into seven undergraduate departments and one graduate division at its main (Guzman Street) campus, with each college and the graduate division defining its own admission standards and academic programs in near autonomy. The college also administers one satellite Basic Education Campus at Ulas, Davao City. Of its seven undergraduate colleges, five offer degrees in the health sciences. These are the departments of Nursing, Pharmacy, Physical Therapy, Respiratory Therapy, and Medical Technology. SPC's graduate school offers two doctorate programs, one master in nursing program, and five master of arts programs.

Since its founding, San Pedro College has been a coed, Catholic institution where admission has not been restricted by gender, race or religion (despite being a Catholic institution). The student body consists of nearly 7,000 undergraduate and 100 graduate students from all over the country, but majority comes from Mindanao particularly Davao City, where the school is located. Basic Education enrollees total to around 4,000.

In 2012, San Pedro College opened its Ulas Campus at Ulas, Davao City for School Year 2012-2013.

Last August 2016, San Pedro College adopted the North American academic calendar, with the school year beginning in mid-August and the second semester starting on a late January or early February. Academic years are expected to end at June.

Programs Offered

Nursing
SPC's Nursing Department ranked 4th according to the Professional Regulation Commission based on the January 2016 Licensure Exams.

Respiratory Therapy
SPC's Respiratory Therapy program ranked first in the September 2014 and 2015 RT board exams, and  occupies second place in the Philippines.

Medical Technology (Medical Laboratory Science)
In the September 2014, September 2015, and August 2016 Medical Technology Licensure examinations, SPC's Medical Technology program ranked 9th, 5th and 6th respectively.

Pharmacy
The school was ranked first in the June 2016 Pharmacist Licensure Examinations by the Professional Regulation Commission. SPC's Department of Pharmacy has been ranked as one of the Top 5 Pharmacy Programs in the Philippines in the past few years, garnering the 4th spot twice in the July 2015 and January 2016 Pharmacy Licensure Examinations, and the second spot in the January 2014 exam.

Radiologic Technology
The school is offering BS Radiologic Technology starting S.Y. 2018 - 2019.

Ulas Campus
In 2012, San Pedro College opened its Ulas Campus at Ulas, Davao City for School Year 2012-2013, accepting its first applicants for Pre-School, Grades 1 to 4, and 1st to 2nd Year High School, with its first principal, Sr. Bambina P. Lapara, O.P. At present, the Ulas Campus now offers Pre-School, Grades 1-6, 7-10, and Senior High School. Although the campus is not accepting Grade 6 and 10 transferees. SPC also offers Senior High School admissions at the Main Campus. Its present principal is Sr. Josefa E. Dumapias, O.P.

Notable alumni
Sara Duterte-Carpio - politician,  15th Vice President of the Philippines, 38th Secretary of Education,Former Mayor of Davao City (B.S)

References

External links

Educational institutions established in 1956
Nursing schools in the Philippines
Universities and colleges in Davao City
1956 establishments in the Philippines
Schools in Davao City